Norman Prescott (January 31, 1927 – July 2, 2005) was co-founder and executive producer at Filmation Associates, an animation studio he created with veteran animator Lou Scheimer.

Life and career 
Born in the Dorchester neighborhood of Boston, his real name was Norman Pransky.  His father Edward was a tailor and a shirt-maker. A graduate of Boston Latin School and Boston University, he began his career as a disc jockey. His first radio job, c. 1947, was at WHEB in Portsmouth NH. In 1948 he joined WHDH, and in October 1950, he became program director at station WORL. He briefly worked in New York at WNEW, before relocating to WBZ radio in late 1955; in 1956, he became one of the "Live Five" after WBZ dropped its syndicated NBC programming and went on the air with live disc jockeys. In the summer of 1959, he left radio and went to work for Joseph E. Levine's Embassy Pictures Corporation, serving as vice president of music, merchandising and post-production. He, Lou Scheimer and Hal Sutherland formed Filmation in 1963.

Productions 

 1965 Pinocchio in Outer Space (Belgian co-produced feature film)
 1966 The New Adventures of Superman
 1968 Fantastic Voyage
 1968 The Batman/Superman Hour
 1968 The Archie Show
 1969 The Hardy Boys
 1970 Will the Real Jerry Lewis Please Sit Down
 1970 The Groovie Goolies
 1970 Fat Albert and the Cosby Kids
 1972 The Brady Kids
 1973 Star Trek: The Animated Series
 1973 Lassie's Rescue Rangers
 1963 My Favorite Martians
 1974 The U.S. of Archie
 1974 The New Adventures of Gilligan
 1975 The Original Ghostbusters
 1976 Tarzan, Lord of the Jungle
 1976 Ark II
 1978 Tarzan and the Super 7
 1978 Fabulous Funnies

Other Professional Work 
Prescott also produced and directed the 1973 animated film Treasure Island and produced and wrote 1974's Journey Back to Oz which featured Liza Minnelli as the voice of Dorothy. (Ms. Minnelli is the daughter of Judy Garland, who portrayed that same character in MGM's 1939 live action film.)

Filmation produced the popular Star Trek animated series in 1973. Prescott also was producer for The Secret Lives of Waldo Kitty, Tarzan, Lord of the Jungle, The Space Sentinels, The New Adventures of Flash Gordon, The New Adventures of Mighty Mouse and Heckle and Jeckle (he also voiced Theodore H. Bear in the show's Quacula episodes), Sport Billy, The Tom and Jerry Comedy Show, and Blackstar.

Death 
Prescott died of natural causes in Los Angeles on July 2, 2005, at the age of 78. Professionally, he was survived by Scheimer and his colleagues at Filmation. He was also survived by his wife, Elaine, to whom he had been married for fifty-three years, and sons Jeffrey and Michael.

References

External links 

 
 

1927 births
2005 deaths
Filmation people
American film producers
American animated film producers
American radio DJs
Businesspeople from Boston
20th-century American musicians